Scone Aerodrome may refer to:

 Perth Airport (Scotland), an airport near the Scottish city of Perth, situated in village of Scone
 Scone Airport, an airport serving the town of Scone in the Australian state of New South Wales